Kissing Cup's Race is a 1930 British drama film directed by Castleton Knight and starring Stewart Rome, Madeleine Carroll and John Stuart. It was made at Walton Studios.

Cast
 Stewart Rome as Lord Rattlington 
 Madeleine Carroll as Lady Molly Adair  
 John Stuart as Lord Jimmy Hilhoxton  
 Richard Cooper as Rollo Adair  
 Chili Bouchier as Gabrielle  
 Moore Marriott as Joe Tricker  
 J. Fisher White as Marquis of Hilhoxton  
 James Knight as Detective  
 Gladys Hamer as Maid  
 Wally Patch as Bookie

References

Bibliography
 Low, Rachael. Filmmaking in 1930s Britain. George Allen & Unwin, 1985.
 Wood, Linda. British Films, 1927-1939. British Film Institute, 1986.

External links

1930 films
British drama films
1930 drama films
Films shot at Nettlefold Studios
Films directed by Castleton Knight
British black-and-white films
1930s English-language films
1930s British films